Holmes Community College is a public community college with its main campus in Goodman, Mississippi. It also has campuses in Grenada and Ridgeland, and satellite campuses in Attala, Webster, and Yazoo counties.

Holmes Community College was established in 1911, when plans were made to found Holmes County Agricultural High School in Goodman, Mississippi. The town of Goodman provided  of land (along with free water from the community's artesian well) on the west side of town, and the Board of Trustees purchased an additional  adjacent to the original school location.  The mascot of Holmes Community College is the bulldog.

It was previously Holmes Junior College (HJC).

History
Holmes Community College originally began as Holmes County Agricultural High School, established in 1911 when the town of Goodman provided forty acres of land and the Board of Trustees bought forty-two acres of land on the west side of Goodman, Mississippi.  In 1922, the Mississippi Legislature made it legal for agricultural high schools to add two years of college work.  Holmes added the first year of college work in the 1925-1926 school session, and a sophomore year of college work in the 1928-1929 school session.

Service area
Counties it serves, in addition to Holmes, are Attala, Carroll, Choctaw, Grenada, Madison, Montgomery, Webster, and Yazoo.

Campuses
 Goodman Campus, Goodman
 Grenada Center, Grenada
 Ridgeland Campus, Ridgeland
 Kosciusko - Attala Educational Center / Workforce Development, Kosciusko
 Yazoo Center, Yazoo City

Notable alumni

Max Dale Cooper, immunologist.
Walter Jones, professional football player in the NFL (Seattle Seahawks) and member of the Professional Football Hall of Fame
Alvin McKinley professional football player in the NFL.
Roy Oswalt professional baseball player in the MLB.
Trumaine Sykes, professional football player in the NFL, CFL and Arena Football League.

References

External links
 Official website

Community colleges in Mississippi
Educational institutions established in 1911
Universities and colleges accredited by the Southern Association of Colleges and Schools
Education in Attala County, Mississippi
Education in Carroll County, Mississippi
Education in Choctaw County, Mississippi
Education in Grenada County, Mississippi
Education in Holmes County, Mississippi
Education in Madison County, Mississippi
Education in Montgomery County, Mississippi
Education in Webster County, Mississippi
Education in Yazoo County, Mississippi
NJCAA athletics
1911 establishments in Mississippi